The 1981 New York Jets season was the 22nd season for the franchise and its twelfth in the National Football League. It began with the team trying to improve upon its 4–12 record from 1980 under head coach Walt Michaels. The Jets sputtered early, starting 0–3 and (combined with the previous season's 4–12 finish) fueling a quarterback controversy and altercation between quarterback Richard Todd and sports writer Steve Serby and speculation about Michaels’ job. After the 0–3 start, however, the Jets would catch fire, and go on a 10–2–1 run. The team ultimately finished the season with a record of 10–5–1 and qualified for the playoffs for the first time since 1969, breaking a twelve-season drought. In the playoffs, however, they fell to their division rivals, the Buffalo Bills, 31–27.

Offseason

Draft

Roster

Regular season

Schedule 

Note: Intra-division opponents are in bold text.

Season summary

Week 15 at Browns

Playoffs 

TV Announcers (NBC): Charlie Jones, Len Dawson

AFC: Buffalo Bills 31, New York Jets 27

Standings

References

External links 
 1981 statistics

New York Jets seasons
New York Jets
New York Jets season
1980s in Queens